Elizabeth A. Scarlett (Brooklyn, April 11, 1961) is an American academic and writer. She is a Spanish professor in the Department of Romance Languages & Literatures at the University at Buffalo of the State University of New York. She completed her undergraduate degree in Comparative Literature at Washington University in St. Louis, and her graduate degrees at Harvard University. She was a Fulbright Foreign Language Teaching Assistant in 1983-84 in Carcassonne, France, and was an exchange student in 1988-89 at the University of Seville, Spain.

The Cervantes Institute lists her among the major figures in United States Hispanophone studies. Her first book, Under Construction: The Body in Spanish Novels (University Press of Virginia, 1994) was selected for the 1995 Outstanding Academic Books List by Choice magazine. Her second sole-authored book is Religion and Spanish Film: Luis Buñuel, the Franco Era, and Contemporary Directors (University of Michigan Press, 2014). She also co-edited (with Howard B. Wescott) the collection Convergencias Hispánicas: Selected Proceedings and Other Essays on Spanish and Latin American Literature, Film, and Linguistics (Juan de la Cuesta Hispanic Monographs, 2001). She has published numerous critical essays in refereed journals and peer-edited volumes in North America and in Europe. Her literary criticism is based on narrative theory and feminism. Her work on film "combines auteurist study with genre analysis" and accentuates the persistence of Catholic imagery and themes in Spanish cinema.

Works Freely Accessible Online 

• "Martyrs and Saints of the Spanish Civil War Era: Enshrinement of the Right and Historical Memory." Rite, Flesh, and Stone: The Matter of Death in Contemporary Spanish Culture (1959-2020). Ed. Daniel García Donoso and Antonio Cordoba. Nashville: University of Vanderbilt Press, 2021. Pages 97-118 [pages not numbered online; the essay is found by clicking on Chapter 4 in the Table of Contents].

• "RECording the End Time in Twenty-First-Century Spanish Film." Hispanic Issues On-Line (HIOL) 23 (2019): 184-205.

• "El feminismo en la ficción de Gertrudis Gómez de Avellaneda y de Clara Sánchez." AnMal Electrónica 42 (2017): 179-87.

• "Luis Buñuel: Introduction," "Luis Buñuel: Overviews" Oxford Bibliographies: Cinema and Media Studies. Oxford, U.K.: Oxford University Press, 2016.

• "Introduction: God and the Spanish Director." Religion and Spanish Film: Luis Buñuel, the Franco Era, and Contemporary Directors. Ann Arbor: University of Michigan Press, 2014. Pages 1-20.

• "Pedro Almodóvar and the Professions: The Case of La piel que habito." MIFLC Review 16 (2012-2014): 81-92.

• “Comparative Crime Narrative: Muñoz Molina’s Plenilunio and Ellroy’s My Dark Places.” Cuaderno Internacional de Estudios Humanísticos y Literatura: CIEHL, Special Issue: La novela española actual: Desde 1975 al presente. Ed. Ellen Mayock. 16 (Fall 2011): 248-55.

• "Pascual Duarte y los asesinos en serie." Actas del XII Congreso de la Asociación Internacional de Hispanistas. Vol. 5. Ed. Derek Flitter. Birmingham, U.K.: University of Birmingham and Doelphin Books, 1998. Pages 250-256.

• "Conversación con Antonio Muñoz Molina." España Contemporánea 7.1 (Spring 1994): 69-82.

• "Introduction." Under Construction: The Body in Spanish Novels. Charlottesville: University Press of Virginia, 1994. Pages 1-9.

References

External links 
 Faculty Profile, University at Buffalo Department of Romance Languages & Literatures

Washington University in St. Louis alumni
Harvard University alumni
University at Buffalo faculty
1961 births
American women academics
Writers from Brooklyn
Living people